La Llorona is the debut studio album by Canadian singer Lhasa de Sela, released in 1997 in Canada and 1998 elsewhere.

Concept
Alejandro Sela, Lhasa's father, received his doctorate on literature of the Spanish conquest of the Aztec Empire and taught her of the legend of La Llorona.  This is the folktale of the crying woman, resembled the mythological wife of Quetzalcoatl who has lost her children.  For Lhasa, La Llorona comes from the omen of conquerors.  Lhasa believes that the woman cried when the Spanish arrived in America to warn her native children of the doom that the conquistadors would bring to their way of life.

Sales and certifications
 
According to billboard in 2003, it had sold 120,000 units in Canada (Platinium ), 330,000 in France, and 30,000 in the U.S

Track listing
All music and lyrics by Lhasa de Sela and Yves Desrosiers except where noted.

Personnel

Musicians
 Lhasa de Sela - Vocals, artwork, English and French translations
 Yves Desrosiers - Guitars, lap steel, bass, saw, accordion, banjo, percussion, production, arranging
 Mario Légaré - Bass, double bass
 François Lalonde - Percussion, drums, sampling, programming

Production
 Jean Massicotte - Mixing
 Don Hachey - Assistant mixing
 Jean Bouthillette - Technical coordination
 Jean-Francois Chicoine - Mastering
 Eve Cournoyer - Graphic coordination
 Lousank - Graphic design
 Carl Lessard - Photography
 Alissa Hill - Makeup
 Sandra Khouri - French translations

References 

1997 debut albums
Lhasa de Sela albums
Audiogram (label) albums
La Llorona
Juno Award for Global Music Album of the Year albums